The Vicuña Mackenna Batholith is a group of plutons in the Chilean Coast Range of northern Chile. The plutons of the batholith formed (cooled from magma to rock) between the Early Jurassic and the Late Cretaceous (192–98 Ma). The magmas that formed the batholith originated in Earth's mantle and have not suffered any significant crustal contamination. A group of Early Cretaceous plutons were intruded syn-tectonically on the Atacama Fault.

Subdivision 
Geologists Miguel Hervé and Nicolás Marinivic identify six major units. From the oldest to the youngest these are:
 Barazate Unit (192-181 Ma)
 Paranal Unit (ca. 170 Ma). This unit has the largest areal extent. It is composed of gabbronorite, gabbro, diorite, monzodiorite, monzogabbro and monzogabbronorite.
 Ventarrones Unit (149-138 Ma)
 Remiendos Unit (133-128 Ma)
 Herradura Unit (108-98 Ma)

See also 
 Coastal Batholith of Peru

References 

Batholiths of South America
Lithodemic units of Chile
Geology of Antofagasta Region
Geology of the Chilean Coast Range
Jurassic Chile
Cretaceous Chile
Jurassic magmatism
Cretaceous magmatism